Western Punjabi may refer to:

Lahnda, a linguistically defined group of languages/dialects primarily found in Western Punjab
the group of all the Punjabi varieties, whether Lahnda or not, that are spoken in Pakistan
the form of the standard Punjabi language in Pakistan (ISO 639-3: pnb)

See also
 Western Punjab (disambiguation)